Joycelyn Ko (born January 10, 1986) is a former Canadian badminton player who competed in singles and doubles events at international level events. 

Her highest achievement is winning silver and bronze medals at the 2011 Pan American Games. She also represented her country at the BWF World Championships in 2010 and 2014 reaching the round of 32 at the 2010 BWF World Championships and has also participated at the 2010 Commonwealth Games.

References

1986 births
Living people
Badminton players at the 2010 Commonwealth Games
Badminton players at the 2011 Pan American Games
Canadian female badminton players
Sportspeople from Scarborough, Toronto
Commonwealth Games competitors for Canada
Pan American Games competitors for Canada
Pan American Games medalists in badminton
Pan American Games silver medalists for Canada
Pan American Games bronze medalists for Canada
Medalists at the 2011 Pan American Games